The durangonella de Coahuila snail, scientific name Durangonella coahuilae,  is a species is a genus of minute freshwater snails with an operculum, aquatic gastropod molluscs or micromolluscs in the family Hydrobiidae.

This species is endemic to Mexico; Coahuila being a state in the northeastern part of Mexico.

References

Durangonella
Hydrobiidae
Endemic molluscs of Mexico
Gastropods described in 1966
Taxonomy articles created by Polbot
Taxobox binomials not recognized by IUCN